The canton of Arras-3 is an administrative division of the Pas-de-Calais department, in northern France. It was created at the French canton reorganisation which came into effect in March 2015. Its seat is in Arras.

It consists of the following communes: 

Achicourt
Agny
Arras (partly)
Beaurains 
Boiry-Becquerelle
Boisleux-au-Mont
Boisleux-Saint-Marc
Boyelles
Guémappe
Héninel
Hénin-sur-Cojeul
Mercatel
Neuville-Vitasse
Saint-Martin-sur-Cojeul
Tilloy-lès-Mofflaines
Wancourt

References

Cantons of Pas-de-Calais